Naantalintie (Finnish; Nådendalsvägen in Swedish) is a ward of Turku, Finland, also known as Ward 8. The ward is located to the west of the city and named after the major route that passes through the ward in the direction of Naantali. The ward also includes the island of Ruissalo.

The ward has a population of 10,257 and an annual population decrease of 1.60%. 17.42% of the ward's population are under 15 years old, while 11.88% are over 65. The ward's linguistic makeup is 90.76% Finnish, 2.16% Swedish, and 7.08% other.

Districts
The ward consists of six districts. One of them is divided with another ward.

See also 
Districts of Turku
Wards of Turku

Notes

Wards of Turku